Eric and Mary was an Australian television programme which aired in 1956. It was one of the earliest Australian-produced television series. It was an "informal programme with guest artists", likely an interview show, hosted by Eric Pearce (later Sir Eric) and Mary Parker. It was broadcast on Melbourne station HSV-7. The station began broadcasting on 4 November 1956, and Eric and Mary debuted a few days later on the 7th.

Broadcast in a 15-minute time-slot at 7:15 PM on Wednesdays, the series had no competition in the time-slot when it debuted, as there were no other television stations in Melbourne until 19 November 1956 when ABV-2 began broadcasting. On 21 November 1956 the series competed in its time-slot against ABV-2's broadcast of Miss Pilgrim's Progress, a 1950 British film. Later episodes competed against American music series Florian Zabach and later by American sitcom The Life of Riley.

It was preceded on HSV-7's schedule by a 15-minute newscast and followed by U.S. series The Adventures of Rin Tin Tin.

See also
The Judy Jack Show - Australian-produced children's series which aired on HSV-7 from 1956 to 1957, also on Wednesdays
Be My Guest - Also with Eric Pearce

References

External links

Seven Network original programming
1956 Australian television series debuts
1956 Australian television series endings
Black-and-white Australian television shows
English-language television shows